WKSK can refer to:

 WKSK (AM), a radio station (580 AM) licensed to West Jefferson, North Carolina, United States
 WKSK-FM, a radio station (101.9 FM) licensed to South Hill, Virginia, United States